Trégarantec is a commune in the Finistère department of Brittany in north-western France.

Population
Inhabitants of Trégarantec are called in French Trégarantécois.

See also
Communes of the Finistère department

References

External links

Mayors of Finistère Association 

Communes of Finistère